The Progressive Party of Working People (abbr. , AKEL) is a Marxist–Leninist communist party in Cyprus.

AKEL is one of the two major parties in Cyprus, and it supports a federal solution of the internal aspect of the Cyprus problem and it places particular emphasis on rapprochement with the Turkish Cypriots. It supported entry into the European Union with certain reservations. Initially supportive of the Annan Plan in 2004, the AKEL ultimately opposed the plan because the UN Security Council did not provide guarantees on post-reunification security.

As a strong supporter of welfare benefits and nationalization, AKEL successfully put into practice several social measures to support the economic welfare of Cypriots during the late-2000s financial crisis, such as increasing low pensions by 30% and strengthening the welfare benefits given to university students to €12 million per year. Overall, €1.2 billion were spent on welfare benefits during the first three years that AKEL was in power, with various improvements made in social welfare provision. The party is now in opposition following the 2013 election. The party's candidate was defeated in the 2018 presidential election against the incumbent president.

History
It was founded in 1926 with the name Communist Party of Cyprus (CPC). The communist party set as its aim not only the struggle against exploitation, but also the independence of Cyprus from British rule. The party became illegal in 1931 when the British colonial government-imposed restrictions on civil rights following the Cyprus revolt riot. In 1941, leading members of the underground communist party and others founded AKEL. In the first municipal elections in 1943 (before that mayors were appointed) AKEL candidates became mayors of Limassol (Ploutis Servas) and Famagusta (Adam Adamantos).

List of general secretaries:

 1936–1945 Ploutis Servas
 1945–1949 Fifis Ioannou
 1949–1988 Ezekias Papaioannou
 1988–2009 Dimitris Christofias (6th President of the Republic of Cyprus)
 2009–2021 Andros Kyprianou
 2021-today Stefanos Stefanou

Unlike its predecessor, AKEL was not against Enosis. Instead, AKEL supported a gradual process, starting off with a constitution and self-government, while Cyprus would remain a colony, leading to self-determination and Enosis. After the failure of the consultative assembly in 1949 to grant a constitution acceptable to the Cypriot members, AKEL changed line, supporting immediate Enosis with no intermediate stages.

During the late 1950s, AKEL was opposed to the violent tactics followed by the anti-British resistance movement of EOKA. EOKA accused AKEL of being collaborators with the British, even though AKEL had also been illegal since 1955. Several AKEL members were assassinated by EOKA at the time for being "traitors", including AKEL supporter Savas Menikou, who was stoned to death. AKEL denounced EOKA's leadership as being anti-communist, as its leader George Grivas had fought against the communist side during the Greek Civil War. Grivas later founded EOKA B, which supported the 1974 coup d'état following his death.

About 1958, the Turkish Cypriot nationalist organization TMT started forcing Turkish Cypriots members of AKEL to leave. Editor of a workers' newspaper Fazıl Önder was killed and the head of the Turkish bureau of PEO (AKEL's trade union) Ahmet Sadi moved to the UK to save his life.

In the first presidential elections for independent Cyprus, AKEL backed Ioannis Kliridis (father of Glafkos Klerides) against Makarios III. The last Turkish Cypriot to be a member of the central committee of AKEL, Derviş Ali Kavazoğlu, was killed by TMT in 1965.

In the mid 1960s the U.S. State Department estimated the party membership to be approximately 10,000 (3.25% of the working age population).

Recent history

At the legislative elections on 27 May 2001, the party won 34.7% of the popular vote and 20 out of 56 seats. After this election, AKEL's General Secretary, Dimitris Christofias, was elected as President of the House of Representatives, serving in that post until 2006. His election was supported by AKEL, Movement for Social Democracy (EDEK), and the Democratic Party (DIKO).

AKEL is a member of the European United Left - Nordic Green Left political group in the European Parliament, and it is considered to be moderately eurosceptic. Cyprus joined the EU in 2004, and in the 2004 European parliament election, AKEL elected two members (Adamos Adamou and Kyriacos Triantaphyllides).

AKEL remained the largest political party in the 2006 legislative elections; however, the party lost two seats, winning 18 seats with 31.31% of the vote.

In the second round presidential election held on 24 February 2008, Dimitris Christofias, General Secretary of AKEL, was elected President of Cyprus. Christofias won 53.36% of the vote against his right-wing opponent Ioannis Kasoulidis' 46.64%.

On 21 January 2009, Andros Kyprianou was elected general secretary of the party with 54.3% in the central committee election.

In the 2009 election to the European Parliament, AKEL received 34.9% of the votes, and again elected two out of Cyprus' six members (Kyriacos Triantaphyllides and Takis Hadjigeorgiou). In the 2014 election, they held their two seats with a reduced 27% of the vote.

In the 22 May 2011 legislative election AKEL received 32.67% of the votes, and elected 19 out of the 56 members of parliament.

In an interview with Athens News Agency, party leader Andros Kyprianou said that AKEL was considering Cyprus' exit from the eurozone, saying, "It is an option on the table", but that it will require "study and planning".

In the 2013 presidential election, Stavros Malas, who was supported by AKEL lost by a margin of 42.52% to 57.48%. In the 2018 presidential election, conservative president Nicos Anastasiades won a second five-year term with 56 percent of the vote. The AKEL-backed independent candidate, Stavros Malas, lost the election with 44 percent.

In 2016 legislative election AKEL was the second largest party with 25.7 percent of the vote, 7 percent less than the previous election.

Niyazi Kızılyürek was elected to the European Parliament in 2019 for AKEL, making him the first Turkish-Cypriot to enter the European Parliament and thus breaking what was considered a taboo on the island. AKEL advocates the creation of a federal state in which Greek Cypriots and Turkish Cypriots would live together.

Youth

The party's youth wing is the United Democratic Youth Organisation, which was founded in 1959.

Election results

Parliament

European Parliament

AKEL MPs

 2011–present Adamos Adamou
 2007–2011 Dina Akkelidou
 2006–2011 Aristos Aristotelous
 2011–present Irene Charalambides
 1991–2008 Dimitris Christofias
 2011–present Aristos Damianou
 2004–present Stella Demetriou Misiaouli
 1981–1991 Pavlos Diglis
 2001–present Stavros Evagorou
 2006–present Andreas Fakontis
 1970–1991 Andreas Fantis
 2008–present Yiannakis Gavriel
 1991–2011 Aristophanes Georgiou
 2011–2019 Giorgos K. Georgiou
 1996–2009 Takis Hadjigeorgiou
 2003–2011 Dinos Hadjinicolas
 2011–present Christakis Jovanis
 1991–present Nicos Katsourides
 2011–present Andreas Kafkalias
 2011–present Kostas Kosta
 2008–present Skevi Koukouma Koutra
 2001–present Andros Kyprianou
 2006–2011 Pambis Kiritsis
 2001–present Yiannos Lamaris
 1996–2003 Giorgos Lillikas
 2011–present Giorgos Loucaides
 2008-2011 Klavdios Mavrohannas
 2001–2006 Eleni Mavrou
 2011–present Christos Mesis
 2006–2011 Andreas Mouskalis
 2011–2016 Pambos Papageorgiou
 1960–1988 Ezekias Papaioannou
 1985–1991 Michalis Papapetrou
 1970–1991 Georgios Savvides
 2006–present Panikkos Stavrianos
 1996–2011 Yannakis Thoma
 1960–1991 Andreas Ziartides

AKEL MEPs
 2004–2009 Adamos Adamou
 2004–2014 Kyriacos Triantaphyllides
 2009–2019 Takis Hadjigeorgiou
 2014–2019 Neoklis Sylikiotis
 2019–present Niyazi Kızılyürek
 2019–present Giorgos K. Georgiou

References

Citations

Sources

 Panayiotou, A. (2006) "Lenin in the Coffee-Shop: The Communist Alternative and Forms of non-Western Modernity", Postcolonial Studies, 9, 3, pp. 267–280.
 Adams (1971) AKEL: The Communist Party of Cyprus. California: Hoover Press
 Lefkis, G. (1984) Roots (Limassol).
 Fantis (2005) The Cypriot Trade Union Movement During the Period of British Colonialism (Nicosia)
 Servas (1985, 1991) Responsibilities (Athens, Grammi).
 Peristianis (2006) "The Rise of the Left and Intra-Ethnic Cleavages" in Faustmann, H. and Peristianis, N. (ed.), Britain in Cyprus, Colonialism and Post-colonialism 1878-2006. Mannheim, Bibliopolis.
 Philippou, Lambros (2010) "The Cypriot Paradox: The Communist Way Towards Political Liberalism", Cyprus Review, 22, 1, pp. 129–149.
 Δίγκλης, Παύλος (2010) ΑΚΕΛ. Με τόλμη και παρρησία: Προσωπικές μαρτυρίες. Εκδόσεις Επιφανίου.

External links
 AKEL's website in English (also available in Greek and Turkish)

 
1926 establishments in Cyprus
Cyprus
Communist parties in Cyprus
Cypriot nationalism
Cyprus Emergency
Parties represented in the European Parliament
Party of the European Left observer parties
Political parties established in 1926
Political parties in Cyprus
International Meeting of Communist and Workers Parties